St. James's Hospital   is a teaching hospital in Dublin, Ireland. Its academic partner is Trinity College Dublin. It is managed by Dublin Midlands Hospital Group.

History
The origins of the hospital lie in a poorhouse initiated when Dublin Corporation paid £300 to acquire the site in 1603. The war between William III and James II intervened and the project was abandoned until Mary, Duchess of Ormonde, wife of James Butler, 2nd Duke of Ormonde laid a foundation stone in 1703. The pamphleteer, Jonathan Swift, lobbied for the creation of facilities for abandoned infants and, in 1727, the poorhouse was expanded by the addition of a foundling hospital. The brewer Arthur Guinness served on the board of directors in its early years.

The foundling hospital closed in 1829 and the buildings were absorbed by the South Dublin Union Workhouse. During the Easter Rising in 1916, the South Dublin Union Workhouse was occupied by rebel forces. The poorhouse evolved to become a municipal hospital known as St Kevin's Hospital, following Irish independence in 1921, and changed its name to St. James's Hospital in 1971.

The Trinity Centre, which incorporates the clinical departments of Trinity College's Medical School and its medical library, opened in 1994.

A new radiation therapy unit for cancer treatment was established at the hospital in 2012.

The St James's campus was chosen in 2012 as the site for the National Paediatric Hospital, allowing colocation with the adult hospital, and potentially "trilocation" with a future maternity hospital on the same site.

In 2015, the hospital became the first hospital in Ireland to introduce routine testing for HIV and hepatitis for all patients arriving at the hospital.

Services
The hospital, which is the main teaching hospital for Trinity College Dublin, has 1,010 beds.

Notable people
 Anne Young, founder of the first Irish school of general nursing.

References

Further reading

External links
 

Teaching hospitals of the University of Dublin, Trinity College
Teaching hospitals in Dublin (city)
Buildings and structures completed in 1727
Hospital buildings completed in the 18th century
1727 establishments in Ireland
Hospitals established in 1971
Poor law infirmaries
Voluntary hospitals
Health Service Executive hospitals